Domenico Meccoli (4 January 1913 – 21 November 1983) was an Italian film critic, journalist, screenwriter and occasional actor. Born in Assisi, Meccoli started his career as a  journalist and a film critic for the magazine Cinema, and later for several decades he was film critic and chief editor of the magazine Epoca.

He wrote for nine films between 1939 and 1954.  He was a member of the jury at the 16th Venice International Film Festival in 1955, at the 9th Cannes Film Festival in 1956 and at the 18th Berlin International Film Festival in 1968. In 1961 and 1962 he served as artistic director of the Venice Film Festival.

Selected filmography
 Cardinal Messias (1939)
 Hurricane in the Tropics (1939)
 Flying Squadron (1949)
 Stormbound (1950)
 Tomorrow Is Another Day (1951)
 I due derelitti (1951)
 Tom Toms of Mayumba (1955,  actor)

References

External links

1913 births
1983 deaths
20th-century Italian screenwriters
Italian male screenwriters
Italian male journalists
Italian male film actors
Italian film critics
20th-century Italian male actors
20th-century Italian journalists
20th-century Italian male writers